Cyril Lahana is a former South African international lawn bowler.

He won the triples silver medal and fours bronze medal at the 1992 World Outdoor Bowls Championship in Worthing.

References

South African male bowls players
Living people
Year of birth missing (living people)